Maher Aref Abbas (born 22 April 1966) is a former Lebanese-American athlete, who represented Lebanon at the 1988 Summer Olympic Games in the Men's 800m. He finished 7th place in his heat and failed to advance.

References

1966 births
Athletes (track and field) at the 1988 Summer Olympics
Living people
Lebanese male middle-distance runners
Olympic athletes of Lebanon